KXL may refer to:

 KXL-FM, a radio station (101.1 FM) licensed to serve Portland, Oregon, United States
 KXTG, a radio station (750 AM) licensed to serve Portland, Oregon, United States, known as KXL until 2011
 Keystone XL, an oil pipeline system meant to transport crude oil from  Canada to Texas. 
 Corneal collagen cross-linking, also known as KXL